Osino is a rural locality (a village) in Florishchinskoye Rural Settlement, Kolchuginsky District, Vladimir Oblast, Russia. The population was 17 as of 2010. There are 2 streets.

Geography 
Osino is located 19 km northwest of Kolchugino (the district's administrative centre) by road. Ladozhino is the nearest rural locality.

References 

Rural localities in Kolchuginsky District